Julie Roy (born May 11, 1973) is a Canadian producer of animated films, who since 2014 is the executive producer of the French animation studio at the National Film Board.

Born in Montreal, Roy won a Canadian Screen Award for Best Animated Short at the 1st Canadian Screen Awards in 2013 as producer of the film Paula. In the same year, she was also nominated as a producer of Bydlo and Edmond Was a Donkey (Edmond était un âne). At the 4th Canadian Screen Awards, she was nominated twice in the same category as producer of Carface (Autos Portraits) and In Deep Waters (Dans les eaux profondes). In 2016, she was NFB co-producer on Franck Dion's The Head Vanishes. In 2017, she produced Matthew Rankin's The Tesla World Light, which premiered at the 2017 Cannes Film Festival''.

See also
 René Jodoin, NFB French Animation Studio founder

References

External links
 

Film producers from Quebec
Canadian animated film producers
National Film Board of Canada people
Living people
French Quebecers
Canadian women film producers
1973 births
People from Montreal